The Binda Group is an Italian watch, jewellery, leather accessories corporate group founded by Innocente Binda in 1906, headquartered in Milan and headed by brothers Marcello and Simone Binda, grandsons of the founder.

Organization
The company owns subsidiaries in eight countries. Binda's three main business units are watches, jewellery and leather. It produces and distributes its own brands, including several companies. The group also licences watch and jewellery brands from Dolce & Gabbana with brands D&G Time and D&G Jewels, from Moschino with brands Moschino CheapAndChic and Love Moschino, from Ducati Corse and from Nike. In 1997, Binda acquired the distribution rights to Seiko and Lorus for the Italian market.

Binda operates in more than 70 markets with approximately 400 employees worldwide, and ended 2007 with consolidated revenues of €297 million and sales of approximately 5 million pieces. Its watches include those made in the Far East, retailing under $100 (75 euros), Swiss-made ones, averaging about $1,400 (1,000 euros), and complicated tourbillon watches, retailing above $184,000 (130,000 euros).
Breil Milano’s two brand ambassadors are Oscar-winning actress Charlize Theron and film actor Edward Norton.

Subsidiaries

The following companies are wholly owned subsidiaries of Binda Group:
Breil (company),
Vetta (company),
Wyler Genève,
Hip Hop (company),
Chronotech,
Freestyle California, 
Think Big Jewels,
Feelo.

External links
Binda Group

References

Manufacturing companies established in 1906
Watchmaking conglomerates
Manufacturing companies based in Milan
Watch manufacturing companies of Italy
Italian brands
Design companies established in 1906
Italian companies established in 1906
Corporate groups